Paul Gerhard Schmidt (25 March 1937 – 25 September 2010) was a German medievalist and professor emeritus of medieval Latin philology.

Biography
Schmidt was born on 25 March 1937 in Pieske near Frankfurt (Oder). He took his abitur in 1956 at the Evangelischen Gymnasium in Berlin-Grunewald, and studied classical and medieval Latin philology in Berlin and Göttingen. He received his Ph.D. in July 1962 from the University of Göttingen, with the dissertation Supplemente lateinischer Prosa in der Neuzeit: Ein Überblick über Rekonstruktionsversuche zu lateinischen Autoren von der Renaissance bis zur Aufklärung, and then went to Rome where after a two-year study of Auxiliary sciences of history he received the diploma Palaeographus et Archivarius Vaticanus. His 1970 habilitation in Göttingen was based on a critical edition of the Architrenius by Johannes de Hauvilla, which was published in 1974. Schmidt became professor at the University of Marburg in 1978. In 1989 he moved to the University of Freiburg, where he was a professor of medieval Latin philology. He died on 25 September 2010 of a heart attack, and is buried on the Bergäckerfriedhof.

Schmidt was an extraordinary member of the Società Internazionale per lo Studio del Medioevo Latino, corresponding member of the Göttingen Academy of Sciences and the academic society of the Goethe University Frankfurt, and member of the Istituto Lombardo. He had visiting professorships in Oxford, Florence, Fribourg (Wolfgang-Stammler-Gastprofessur 1993–94), Siena, Tartu, and Paris.

Schmidt occupied much of his time with palaeography and codicology. He was editor or co-editor of the series Datierte Handschriften in Bibliotheken der Bundesrepublik Deutschland, Mittellateinische Studien und Texte, and the journal Itineraria: Letteratura di viaggio e conoscenza del mondo dall’Antichità al Rinascimento. Until the end of 1999 he was president of the department of manuscript catalogs of the Deutsche Forschungsgemeinschaft. He was also a member of the council of the Onderzoekschool Mediëvistiek (Leiden/Groningen/Utrecht) and the Institute for European Cultural History (Augsburg).

Schmidt directed 16 dissertations (including that by Johannes Schilling and 3 habilitations (Udo Kühne, Thomas Haye and Elisabeth Stein).

Bibliography
 Andreas Bihrer and Elisabeth Stein (eds.): Nova de Veteribus. Mittel- und neulateinische Studien für Paul Gerhard Schmidt, München and Leipzig: Saur 2004.

External links

 
 Paul Gerhard Schmidt an der Albert-Ludwigs-Universität Freiburg
 Bücher und Aufsätze von Paul Gerhard Schmidt  im Opac der Regesta Imperii

1937 births
2010 deaths
20th-century philologists
German medievalists
German philologists
German Latinists
German palaeographers
Academic staff of the University of Freiburg
Academic staff of the University of Göttingen
Academic staff of the University of Marburg
German male non-fiction writers
Members of the Göttingen Academy of Sciences and Humanities